Vítor Gomes Pereira Júnior (born 8 January 1989), is a Brazilian former professional footballer who played as a midfielder, who is currently the head coach of the LA Galaxy Academy U-19 team playing in the United Premier Soccer League. He is commonly known as Juninho or Vitor Junior, and is the older brother of footballer Ricardo Goulart who plays for Santos.

Career 
Juninho grew up in the city of São Paulo and played for the São Paulo youth team, winning the U-17 Paulista Championship side in 2006. He made one appearance for the São Paulo senior side in 2007. He was sent out on loan to Major League Soccer team Los Angeles Galaxy in 2010 along with fellow Brazilians from the club Alex Cazumba and Leonardo. He made his debut for the team on 27 March 2010, in Galaxy's opening game of the 2010 MLS season against New England Revolution, and scored his first goal for the Galaxy in a 2-0 win over AC St. Louis in the 2010 U.S. Open Cup Round of 16 game on 29 June 2010.
Juninho scored his first goal in a league game against Seattle Sounders FC on 4 July 2010, shooting from over 30 yards out. The goal was named the Goal of the Week for week 13.

Juninho helped Galaxy win the Supporters' Shield in both 2010 and 2011. He was also a key player in the Galaxy's 2011 MLS Cup championship and played the full 90 minutes in the final victory over the Houston Dynamo. At the conclusion of the 2011 MLS season, Juninho left Los Angeles and signed a three-year contract with boyhood club São Paulo. However, in February 2012 Juninho returned to Los Angeles on loan for the 2012 MLS season.

Juninho eventually made his stay at Los Angeles a permanent one when he signed with the club in January 2013 following his release from São Paulo. In his six seasons with LA Galaxy, Juninho made 180 starts and 187 regular season appearances, recording 18 goals and 23 assists along the way. He also recorded an additional 21 appearances, one goal and four assists in postseason play, including scoring the decisive goal in the 2014 Wester Conference Final to send the Galaxy to the MLS Cup.

In December 2015, Juninho was sold to Tijuana of Liga MX, where he signed a three-year deal.

In December 2016, Juninho was loaned from Tijuana to Chicago Fire of Major League Soccer. This loan ended following the conclusion of the 2017 season.

On 18 December 2018, Juninho returned to LA Galaxy for a third stint, after acquiring the Right of First Refusal from the Chicago Fire in exchange for $75,000 in General Allocation Money.

On 30 June 2020, Juninho announced his retirement from playing professional football.

Coaching 
After retiring, Juninho was hired as a academy coach at LA Galaxy. Juninho was named head coach of the LA Galaxy Academy U-19 squad ahead of their first season playing in the United Premier Soccer League. He had previously coached the Galaxy U-14 team before joining Marcelo Sarvas in coaching the Galaxy U-17s.

Personal life 
Juninho holds a U.S. green card which qualifies him as a domestic player in MLS. Juninho's brother Ricardo Goulart is also a footballer best known for playing with former Chinese Super League champion Guangzhou Evergrande, and currently playing for Santos.

Honours

Club 

São Paulo Reserves
 U-17 Paulista Championship: 2006

Los Angeles Galaxy
 MLS Cup (3): 2011, 2012, 2014
 Supporters' Shield (2): 2010, 2011

Individual
 MLS All-Star: 2015

References

External links

 
 

1989 births
Living people
Brazilian expatriate footballers
Brazilian footballers
Expatriate soccer players in the United States
Expatriate footballers in Mexico
Brazilian expatriate sportspeople in the United States
Brazilian expatriate sportspeople in Mexico
LA Galaxy players
São Paulo FC players
Major League Soccer players
Major League Soccer All-Stars
Liga MX players
Club Tijuana footballers
LA Galaxy II players
USL Championship players
People from São José dos Campos
Association football midfielders
Footballers from São Paulo (state)
United Premier Soccer League coaches
Brazilian expatriate football managers
Expatriate soccer managers in the United States